Riverside Cemetery is a historic rural cemetery and national historic district located at Oswego in Oswego County, New York.  It was established in 1855 and designed by landscape architect Burton Arnold Thomas (1808–1880).  Within the boundaries of this contributing site are six contributing buildings, 12 contributing  structures, and 18 contributing objects.  Notable burials include De Witt Clinton Littlejohn (1818–1892), Luther W. Mott (1874–1923), Newton W. Nutting (1840–1889), Joel Turrill (1794–1859), David P. Brewster (1801–1876), Rudolph Bunner (1779–1837), James Cochran (1769–1848), John C. Churchill (1821–1905), Leander Babcock (1811–1864), Abraham P. Grant (1804–1871), and Orville Robinson (1801–1882).

It was listed on the National Register of Historic Places in 1993.

References

External links
 
 Riverside Cemetery – Oswego, NY – U.S. National Register of Historic Places on Waymarking.com
 Riverside Cemetery of Oswego, NY Website
 Riverside Cemetery of Oswego, NY YouTube channel

Cemeteries on the National Register of Historic Places in New York (state)
Historic districts on the National Register of Historic Places in New York (state)
Cemeteries in Oswego County, New York
Oswego, New York
National Register of Historic Places in Oswego County, New York
Rural cemeteries